Sir Robert Peel's first government succeeded the caretaker ministry of the Duke of Wellington. Peel was also Chancellor of the Exchequer while the Duke of Wellington served as Foreign Secretary. A young William Ewart Gladstone held office as a Junior Lord of the Treasury, his first governmental post in a ministerial career that would span for the next sixty years.

The Peel ministry was a minority government, and relied on Whig support. However, this the Whigs felt disinclined to give, joining with the Irish radicals to defeat the Conservatives at every turn. After a reign of only four months, the government felt obliged to resign, whereupon the Whig leader Lord Melbourne formed his second government.

Cabinet

December 1834 – April 1835

List of ministers
Members of the Cabinet are indicated by bold face.

Notes

References
C. Cook and B. Keith, British Historical Facts 1830–1900

British ministries
Government
1834 establishments in the United Kingdom
1835 disestablishments in the United Kingdom
Ministry 1
Ministries of William IV of the United Kingdom
Cabinets established in 1834
Cabinets disestablished in 1835
1830s in the United Kingdom